Vernon Kay Robbins (born March 13, 1939 in Wahoo, Nebraska) is an American New Testament scholar and historian of early Christianity. He is currently Winship Distinguished Research Professor of New Testament and Comparative Sacred Texts at Emory University, as well as visiting professor of New Testament at the University of Stellenbosch in South Africa. He is a major figure in Markan scholarship (scholarship related to the Gospel of Mark) and is the creator and a prominent proponent of socio-rhetorical criticism in New Testament studies.

Robbins obtained a B.A. from Westmar College, an M.Div. from United Theological Seminary and M.A. and Ph.D. degrees from the University of Chicago Divinity School. He taught at the University of Illinois at Urbana-Champaign before moving to Emory and in 1983-84 he was Fulbright Professor at the University of Trondheim.

In 1991, Robbins founded the monograph series Emory Studies in Early Christianity. Then in 2015, he launched the Rhetoric of Religious Antiquity series with the Society of Biblical Literature Press, which contains within it Sociorhetorical Exploration Commentaries.

In 2003, a festschrift was published in his honor, Fabrics of Discourse: Essays in Honor of Vernon K. Robbins, edited by David B. Gowler, L. Gregory Bloomquist, and Duane F. Watson. In 2014, Robbins was featured as one of the five pioneers of New Testament rhetorical criticism in Genealogies of New Testament Rhetorical Criticism, Fortress Press

Works

Feschrift

References

Living people
New Testament scholars
American biblical scholars
University of Chicago Divinity School alumni
University of Illinois Urbana-Champaign faculty
Emory University faculty
Academic staff of the Norwegian University of Science and Technology
1939 births
People from Wahoo, Nebraska
United Theological Seminary alumni